The Băbiu is a left tributary of the river Almaș in Romania. It flows into the Almaș in the village Almașu.

References

Rivers of Romania
Rivers of Sălaj County